Mackellar Glacier is a large tributary glacier in the Queen Alexandra Range, Antarctica, flowing north along the east side of Hampton Ridge from Mount Mackellar, to enter Lennox-King Glacier. It was named by the New Zealand Geological Survey Antarctic Expedition (1961–62) in association with Mount Mackellar.

References

Glaciers of Shackleton Coast